Gustavo Humberto Savoia (born 21 August 1981 in Reconquista, Santa Fe) is an Argentine striker who currently plays for the Club Atlético Mitre. He is nicknamed El Potro.

External links
 Gustavo Savoia at Terra.cl  
 Gustavo Savoia – Argentine Primera statistics at Fútbol XXI  
 Gustavo Savoia at BDFA.com.ar 

1981 births
Living people
Argentine footballers
Argentine expatriate footballers
Association football forwards
Club Atlético Colón footballers
Club Universitario de Deportes footballers
Club de Gimnasia y Esgrima La Plata footballers
Olimpo footballers
Deportes Concepción (Chile) footballers
Deportes Tolima footballers
C.D. Olmedo footballers
Cobreloa footballers
Córdoba CF players
CD Atlético Baleares footballers
Associação Atlética Ponte Preta players
Esporte Clube XV de Novembro (Piracicaba) players
Fortaleza Esporte Clube players
Argentine Primera División players
Categoría Primera A players
Segunda División players
Segunda División B players
Primera B de Chile players
People from Reconquista, Santa Fe
Expatriate footballers in Peru
Argentine expatriate sportspeople in Peru
Expatriate footballers in Colombia
Argentine expatriate sportspeople in Colombia
Expatriate footballers in Ecuador
Argentine expatriate sportspeople in Ecuador
Argentine expatriate sportspeople in Chile
Expatriate footballers in Chile
Expatriate footballers in Brazil
Expatriate footballers in Spain
Argentine expatriate sportspeople in Brazil
Argentine expatriate sportspeople in Spain
Sportspeople from Santa Fe Province